France 3 Centre is one of France 3's regional services broadcasting to people in the Centre-Val de Loire region. It was founded in 1964 as  FR3 Paris Île-de-France Centre.The service is headquartered in Orléans, the capital of the region. Programming is also produced by France 3 Centre.

Presenters
 Delphine Cros
 Wafa Dahman
 Guy Bensimon
 Alain-Georges Emonet
 Alain Heudes
 Bérénice Du Failly
 Pierre Bouchenot
 Antony Masteau
 Jocelyne Thuet
 Christophe Carin

Programming
 Soir 3 Centre
 12/13 Centre
 19/20 Centre
 19/20 Édition Berry
 19/20 Édition Orléans Loiret
 19/20 Édition Touraine Val de Loire

See also
 France 3

References

External links 
  
 

03 Centre
Television channels and stations established in 1964
Mass media in Orléans